Papulonecrotic tuberculid is usually an asymptomatic, chronic skin disorder, presenting in successive crops, skin lesions symmetrically distributed on the extensor extremities.

See also 
 Tuberculid
 List of cutaneous conditions

References

External links 

Mycobacterium-related cutaneous conditions